There were at least two Liberty ships named George Calvert

 , Maritime Commission hull number 20, launched in 1941 as SS George Calvert, but renamed almost immediately.  Best known as a missile range ship in the 1960s, she served under various prefixes: TS, USAS, USAF, USNS.
 , Maritime Commission hull number 29, sunk off Cuba in 1942 by U-753.

Ship names